Helen Barolini (born November 18, 1925) is an American writer, editor, and translator. As a second-generation Italian American, Barolini often writes on issues of Italian-American identity. Among her notable works are Umbertina (1979), a novel which tells the story of four generations of women in one Italian-American family; and an anthology, The Dream Book: An Anthology of Writings by Italian American Women (1985), which called attention to an emerging, and previously unnoticed, class of writers.

Biography

Early life and education 

Helen Frances Barolini (née Mollica) was born on November 18, 1925, in Syracuse, New York, to Italian-American parents. Her father was a local merchant. Although her grandparents were Italian immigrants, Barolini spoke no Italian until she hired a tutor at Syracuse to teach her the language.

She graduated magna cum laude from Syracuse University in 1947, received a diploma di profitto from the University of Florence in 1950, and earned a master's degree in library science from Columbia University in 1959.

Career 

After graduating from Syracuse, Barolini traveled to Italy, studying in Perugia and writing articles for the Syracuse Herald-Journal. It was there that she met and married the Italian writer, Antonio Barolini. The couple lived in Italy for several years before moving to New York. She translated several of her husband's works into English, including "Our Last Family Countess" (1960) and "A Long Madness" (1964).

Assisted by a grant from the National Endowment for the Arts, Barolini completed her first book in 1979: the novel Umbertina, for which she received the Americans of Italian Heritage award for literature in 1984 and the Premio Acerbi, an Italian literary prize, in 2008. The novel is named for her maternal grandmother, who was born in Calabria.

Her anthology, The Dream Book: An Anthology of Writings by Italian American Women (1985), received the American Book Award from the Before Columbus Foundation and the Susan Koppelman Award from the American Culture Association. It was praised by novelists Alice Walker and Cynthia Ozick, and hailed as a major work by critic Jules Chametzky. In an essay on Italian-American novelists, Fred Gardaphé writes, "Until The Dream Book appeared in 1985, Italian American women had not had the critics or literary historians who would attempt to probe their background, unlock the reasons of past silence, and acknowledge that they are finally present."

Barolini's essays have appeared in the New Yorker, Ms., the Yale Review, the Paris Review, the Kenyon Review, the Prairie Schooner, and other journals. Her essay collection, Chiaroscuro: Essays of Identity (1997), was named a Notable Work of American Literary Non-Fiction in The Best American Essays of the Century (2000), and her essay, "How I Learned to Speak Italian," originally published in the Southwest Review, was included in The Best American Essays 1998.

Barolini has been an invited writer at Yaddo (1965) and the MacDowell Colony (1974); writer in residence at the Quarry Farm Center of Elmira College (1989); a Rockefeller Foundation resident scholar at Bellagio Center in Lake Como (1991); and  visiting artist at the American Academy in Rome (2001). She has won numerous prizes and grants for her literary work. She has also taught at Trinity College, Kirkland College, and Pace University; served as associate editor for the Westchester Illustrated; and worked as a librarian in Westchester, New York. In 1988 she was invited to speak at York University in Toronto by Joseph Pivato, the M.A. Elia Chair in Italian-Canadian Studies.

Personal life 

She married Antonio Barolini in 1950. The couple had three daughters. Teodolinda Barolini became a professor of Italian at Columbia University; Susanna Barolini married an Italian artist from Urbino, and moved to Italy; and Nicoletta Barolini became an art director, also at Columbia. Antonio Barolini died in 1971.

Bibliography

Umbertina. (1979) New York: Feminist Press, 1999. .
The Dream Book: An Anthology of Writings by Italian-American Women. (1985) Rev. ed. Syracuse: Syracuse UP, 2000. .
Love in the Middle Ages. New York: Morrow, 1986. .
Festa: Recipes and Recollections of Italian Holidays. Illustrations by Karen Barbour. San Diego: Harcourt Brace Jovanovich, 1988. .
Aldus and His Dream Book: An Illustrated Essay''. New York: Italica Press, 1992. .Chiaroscuro: Essays of Identity. (1997) Rev. ed. Madison: U of Wisconsin P, 1999. .More Italian Hours, and Other Stories. Boca Raton: Bordighera Press, 2001. .Rome Burning. Delhi: Birch Brook Press, 2004. .Their Other Side: Six American Women and the Lure of Italy. New York: Fordham UP, 2006. .A Circular Journey. New York: Fordham UP, 2006. .Crossing the Alps. (2010) Bordighera Press

Awards
2009 Hudson Valley Writers' Center Award
2008 Premio Acerbi for Umbertina2006 William March Short Story Award at the Eugene Walter Writers Festival
2003 Woman of the Year Award in Literature from the Italian Welfare League, New York
2003 Sons of Italy Book Club Selection
2001 Ars et Literas Award from the American Italian Cultural Roundtable
2000 MELUS Award for Distinguished Contribution to Ethnic Studies
2000 Chiaroscuro: Essays of Identity included in Houghton Mifflin's Notable Works of American Literary Non-Fiction in their publication Best American Essays of the Century1987 Susan Koppleman Award from the American Culture Association for The Dream Book1986 American Book Award of The Before Columbus Foundation for The Dream Book1984 Americans of Italian Heritage "Literature and the Arts Award" for Umbertina1982 American Committee on Italian Migration "Women in Literature" Award for Umbertina''
1977-79 Member, The Writers Community, New York City
1976 National Endowment for the Arts Grant in Creative Writing
1970 Marina-Velca essay prize in Italy

Notes

References

Further reading

External links 

 Helen Barolini papers at the Immigration History Research Center Archives, University of Minnesota Libraries.

American women novelists
American writers of Italian descent
1925 births
Living people
Wells College alumni
Writers from Syracuse, New York
Syracuse University alumni
21st-century American novelists
20th-century American novelists
American food writers
Women food writers
American women essayists
20th-century American women writers
21st-century American women writers
20th-century American essayists
21st-century American essayists
American Book Award winners
Novelists from New York (state)